Alexei Volodin (born 1977) is a Russian pianist.

Volodin began taking piano lessons in St. Petersburg at the age of nine. A year later he moved to Moscow, where he studied first with Irina Chaklina and later with Tatiana Zelikman at the Gnessin Music School.He graduated from Moscow Conservatory, where he studied with Prof. Eliso Virsaladze.
In 2003, Volodin won 1st prize at  Géza Anda International Piano Competition. Volodin gave recitals all over the world, and has performed with prestigious orchestras.

Discography 
 Sergei Rachmaninov - Piano Works
 Miroirs
 Frederic Chopin - Piano works
 Beethoven: Sonatas op. 109, E-dur & op. 106, B-dur ("für das Hammerklavier")
 Beethoven: Sonata c-moll op. 111; Rachmaninov: 6 Moments musicaux op. 16; Prokofiev: Sonata no. 7 op. 83
 TCHAIKOVSKY; STRAVINSKY

External links
Alexei Volodin official website
HarrisonParrott website 
Alexei Volodin on a site of opera and ballet
 The New York Times (2009)
 Avery Fisher Hall with Valery Gergiev
 Queen Elizabeth Hall, London
 Total Immersion: The Rite of Spring, Barbican: в The Telegraph
 Alexei Volodin at Sommets Musicaux de Gstaad
 Alexei Volodin in Harrison&Parrot

1977 births
Living people
Russian classical pianists
Male classical pianists
Sydney International Piano Competition prize-winners
Moscow Conservatory alumni
Gnessin State Musical College alumni
21st-century classical pianists
21st-century Russian male musicians